List of the busiest airports in California
In Calendar year 2016 (preliminary FAA data) by 'passenger boardings, not total passengers, except for Tijuana.  While large airports dominant traffic and small airports struggle to retain carriers or completely lose scheduled passenger service, there are but a few growing medium-sized airports.  While only 13 airports had 350,000 boardings or more, the major metropolitan areas dominate the rankings; road traffic instead takes an outsized role in connecting to other regions of the state and winner-take-all dominating airports in traffic clogged areas like LAX crowd out smaller airports from commercial aviation, leaving little option but driving.

Airport list

Notes

References

California